Apriltsi refers to the following places in Bulgaria:

 Apriltsi, small town in Lovech Province
 Apriltsi, Kardzhali Province, village in Kardzhali Province
 Apriltsi, Pazardzhik Province, village in Pazardzhik Province